The Caribbean Club Championship, also known as the CFU Club Championship or CFU Club Champions' Cup, was an annual international football competition held amongst association football clubs that are members of the Caribbean Football Union (CFU). The Caribbean Club Championship served as a qualifying event for the CONCACAF Champions League tournament.

The tournament was officially the Flow CONCACAF Caribbean Club Championship for sponsorship reasons from 2018 to 2022.

With the expansion of the CONCACAF Champions League starting from the 2024 edition, the 2022 edition of the Caribbean Club Championship was the last held. Instead, a regional cup tournament will be launched as a qualifying tournament of the CONCACAF Champions League for teams from the Caribbean, besides those which qualify directly through their professional leagues.

Qualification
Thirty-one national associations affiliated with the CFU were invited to participate, with each eligible to send two clubs, usually their league champions and runners-up. However, many member nations did not send a representative team every year. CFU also allowed Antigua Barracuda, Puerto Rico Islanders, and Puerto Rico FC (all now defunct) to compete despite being members of the United States league system. This tournament currently sent three or four teams to CONCACAF competitions: the champions enter the CONCACAF Champions League, the runners-up and third place teams enter the CONCACAF League, and the fourth place team competed in a playoff with the Caribbean Club Shield winner for a spot in the CONCACAF League.

The CFU presented an exact replica of the championship trophy to the winning team for their permanent possession.

Participation of member associations

The following associations have never had any team participate in a Club Championship:
 Anguilla
 British Virgin Islands
 Grenada
 Turks and Caicos Islands
Associations in italics have had teams participate in the Caribbean Club Shield

Past winners

Results

By club 

 When sorted by years won or lost, the table is sorted by the date of each team's first placement

By country

Caribbean Club Shield

A second-tier competition, called the Caribbean Club Shield, was introduced in 2018 for clubs from non-professional leagues that worked towards professional standards. The winner of this competition, as long as it fulfills the CONCACAF Regional Club Licensing criteria, played against the fourth-placed team of the Caribbean Club Championship for a place in the CONCACAF League.

See also
CONCACAF Champions League
CONCACAF League

Notes and references

External links 
 Caribbean Football Union
 Caribbean Club Championships, RSSSF.com

 
Defunct CONCACAF club competitions
International club association football competitions in the Caribbean
Caribbean Football Union
Recurring sporting events established in 1997
Recurring events disestablished in 2022
1997 establishments in North America
2022 disestablishments in North America